The 1st Wisconsin Infantry Regiment was a volunteer infantry regiment in the Union Army during the American Civil War.

Service

The original 1st Regiment Wisconsin was raised at Milwaukee, Wisconsin, on April 16, 1861, and mustered into Federal service May 17, 1861. The regiment was moved to Harrisburg, Pennsylvania, on June 9. It was assigned to Abercrombie's 6th Brigade of Negley's 2nd Division, Patterson's Army. It spent its service guarding the upper Potomac River crossings. Its only engagement was at the Hoke's Run on July 2. The regiment was mustered out on August 22, 1861.

The regiment was reorganized with new 3-year enlistees by Colonel Starkweather at Milwaukee and was mustered into federal service on October 19, 1861. The regiment was mustered out on October 13, 1864.

Total enlistments and casualties
The 1st Wisconsin Infantry initially mustered 810 men and added no recruits. In its initial 3 months of service, it lost 2 men killed in action or mortally wounded, and one killed accidentally for a total of three fatalities, a death rate of 0.37 percent.  One of the fatalities was Second Sergeant of Company B, Warren M Graham, 18 years old, of Milwaukee, Wisconsin.

When reorganized for 3 years of service, the regiment mustered 945 men and later recruited an additional 563 men, for a total of 1508 men.
The regiment suffered 6 officers and 151 enlisted men killed in action or who later died of their wounds, plus another 1 officer and 142 enlisted men who died of disease, for a total of 300 fatalities.

Commanders
 Colonel John C. Starkweather (April 16, 1861July 17, 1863) was promoted to brigadier general.
 Lt. Colonel George B. Bingham (December 18, 1863October 13, 1864) began the war as captain of Co. A, 1st Wisconsin Infantry, and was promoted to major when the regiment was re-established.  He was designated for promotion to colonel, but was never mustered at that rank.  He mustered out with the regiment in October 1864.

Notable people
 George E. Bryant was captain of Co. E and later colonel of the 12th Wisconsin Infantry Regiment.  After the war he served as a brigadier general in the Wisconsin National Guard and served as a Wisconsin state legislator.
 Seth W. Button was a sergeant in Co. F and was later promoted to sergeant major and 2nd lieutenant.  He was wounded at Chickamauga and resigned.  After the war he became a Wisconsin state legislator, judge, and district attorney.
 Lucius Fairchild was captain of Co. K.  He was later colonel of the 2nd Wisconsin Infantry Regiment and brigadier general.  After the war he became the 10th Governor of Wisconsin.
 Charles L. Harris was lieutenant colonel of the regiment and was later appointed colonel of the 11th Wisconsin Infantry Regiment.  He received an honorary brevet to brigadier general.  After the war he served as a Nebraska state senator.
 Judson G. Hart was enlisted in Co. B and later served in the 7th Independent Battery Wisconsin Light Artillery.  After the war he became a Wisconsin state legislator.
 Charles H. Larrabee was ensign of Co. C, but was commissioned major of the 5th Wisconsin Infantry Regiment after one month.  Later he became colonel of the 24th Wisconsin Infantry Regiment.  Before the war, he had served as a U.S. congressman and Wisconsin Supreme Court justice.
 Pliny Norcross was a corporal in Co. K and later became captain of Co. K in the 13th Wisconsin Infantry Regiment.  After the war he became a Wisconsin state legislator and the 20th mayor of Janesville, Wisconsin.
 James Kerr Proudfit was 2nd lieutenant of Co. K and later became colonel of the 12th Wisconsin Infantry Regiment.  He received an honorary brevet to brigadier general.  After the war he became a Wisconsin state senator.
 Florian J. Ries was enlisted in Co. D and later enlisted in the 17th Wisconsin Infantry Regiment, rising to the rank of 1st lieutenant.  After the war he became a Wisconsin state legislator.
 Christian Sarnow was 2nd lieutenant of Co. H and later served as a 1st lieutenant in the 26th Wisconsin Infantry Regiment.  After the war he became a Wisconsin state legislator.
 Lyman M. Ward was 1st sergeant in Co. I and later became colonel of the 14th Wisconsin Infantry Regiment.  He received an honorary brevet to brigadier general.  After the war he became a Michigan state legislator.

See also

 List of Wisconsin Civil War units
 Wisconsin in the American Civil War

References

External links
The Civil War Archive

1861 establishments in Wisconsin
Military units and formations established in 1861
Military units and formations disestablished in 1864
Units and formations of the Union Army from Wisconsin